The House of Representatives of the Federation of Bosnia and Herzegovina is the lower house of the Parliament of the Federation of Bosnia and Herzegovina, the legislative body of the Federation of Bosnia and Herzegovina, one of two entities of Bosnia and Herzegovina.

Composition

External links
Parliament of the Federation
Constitution of Bosnia Herzegovina 1995 (rev. 2009)

Bosnia and Herzogovina parliaments